The Metropolitan School of Panama (MET) is an international private school located in Green Valley in Panama City, Panama, Established in August 2011, the school offers the IB Curriculum to students in Early Childhood 3 through 12th grade. As of 2021, the school has more than 125 international faculty members teaching over 775 students from more than 45 countries.

History 

In September 2017, the Metropolitan School of Panama joined Nord Anglia Education (NAE).

Accreditations 
The MET is an IB World School, up to 2018, the only school in Central America authorized to offer the IB Continuum of Programs, which means that it offers at least three of the core IB programmes.

References

External links

 

International schools in Panama
2011 establishments in Panama
Educational institutions established in 2011
Nord Anglia Education